Hafid may refer to:

 given name
 Hafid Salhi, a Dutch footballer
 The Sea (2002 film) - a 2002 Icelandic film
Hafid, Yemen